The Representation of the People Act 1948 was an Act of the Parliament of the United Kingdom that altered the law relating to parliamentary and local elections. It is noteworthy for abolishing plural voting for parliamentary elections, including by the abolition of the twelve separate university constituencies; and for again increasing the number of members overall, in this case to 613.

Part I: Parliamentary Franchise and its Exercise
Part I of the Act declared that in future the United Kingdom would be divided into single-member borough constituencies and county constituencies. These terms replaced the former designations of parliamentary borough/division of a parliamentary borough and parliamentary county/division of a parliamentary county (in Scotland "burgh constituencies" replaced parliamentary burghs). There were to be 613 such constituencies, in place of the 591 under previous legislation.

These were to be the only constituencies, and the Act thus abolished the university constituencies; thus graduates of universities (about 7% of the electorate) no longer had the right to vote in two constituencies. Constituencies which had been represented by more than one MP were also abolished.

Persons eligible to vote were to be British subjects of "full age" (21 years) and "not subject to any legal incapacity to vote", provided that they were registered to vote in the constituency. Each voter was only permitted to cast a single vote in one constituency, even if for some reason they were registered in more than one. The arrangements which had given plural votes to electors who met a property qualification because of their business or shop premises were abolished.

Each constituency was to have an electoral registration officer, who was to compile the electoral register. In England and Wales, this officer was the clerk of the appropriate county or borough council; in Scotland, it was the assessor of a county or large burgh; and in Northern Ireland it was the town clerk of the county borough of Belfast or the secretary of the county council. An electoral register was to be published in Spring and Autumn of each year.

Qualifications for an elector to be registered were set out, with residence in the constituency on a specified date being the principal requirement. There was an additional "service qualification" for members of the armed forces and other persons outside the state on diplomatic or other Crown business, and their spouses. Electors were to vote in person, except in exceptional circumstances in which a proxy vote might be permitted.

Each constituency was to be divided into polling districts by the registration officer, who was also to designate polling places within each district. Rules were laid down for the process: for instance each civil parish in an English or Welsh county constituency was to be a separate district. Where a group of thirty electors felt that they were not provided with a convenient polling place, they were entitled to petition the Secretary of State for a review.

The procedures for recounts and for choosing the winning candidate by lot in the event of a tie were laid down. A candidate who received less than an eighth of the total number of votes cast would forfeit their monetary deposit.

Finally Part I dealt with the appointment and duties of the returning officer. In England and Wales these were to be either the high sheriff of a county, the sheriff of a county corporate, the mayor of a borough or the chairman of an urban district council, as appointed by the Home Secretary. In Scotland the returning officer was to be a sheriff of a local sheriffdom, and in Northern Ireland the under-sheriff of a county or county borough.

Part II: General Provisions as to Local Government Franchise and its Exercise
The electorate for local elections was larger than that for parliamentary elections. Apart from those resident in the district, there was an additional "non-resident qualification" to vote where an owner or tenant occupied rateable land or premises therein of the yearly value of not less than ten pounds. The electoral registration officer appointed under Part I of the Act was also to compile a local government register, although the two registers could be combined, with the names of those persons registered only as local government electors marked. Electors were not permitted to be registered more than once in a single local government district, even if they occupied multiple premises. There was no prohibition on voting in different local authority areas, however.

Polling districts were to be delineated and polling places designated by the registration officer. In the absence of other arrangements these were to be identical to those used for parliamentary elections.

Part III: Corrupt and Illegal Practices and other Provisions as to Election Campaign
Part III of the Act set new limits for the expenses that candidates were permitted to pay their election agent. In a county constituency this was to be £450, plus 2d for each name in the electoral register; in borough constituencies it was to be £450 plus 1½d for each elector.

Among other restrictions, no supporter of a candidate was permitted to use a motor vehicle to bring an elector to the polls, or to loan or rent such a vehicle to an elector, unless the vehicle was first registered with the returning officer. There was to be a limit of one vehicle per 1,500 electors in a county constituency and 2,500 in a borough constituency. The broadcast of any programme relating to an election on a radio station other than one operated by the British Broadcasting Corporation was also prohibited. This prohibition extended to broadcasters outside the state.

Each candidate was allowed to send an election address to each elector post free, and was entitled to the use of a room in a publicly funded school in which to hold meetings.

Part IV: Special provisions as to local elections in England and Wales
Part IV altered the dates for the holding of local elections in England and Wales. County councillors were to be elected in the first week of April, and all other councillors in the first week of May. All borough elections were to be held on the same day, set by the Home Secretary. The date for other elections was to be set by the appropriate county council. The change of dates meant that the borough elections due in November 1948 were postponed until the following May. Mayors' and council chairmen's terms of office were extended until the first meeting held after the rescheduled elections.

The constitution of the London County Council was slightly altered: previously two councillors were elected for electoral divisions corresponding to each parliamentary constituency in the County of London, with an additional four for the City of London. With the reorganisation of constituencies in the county by the Act, the City lost its special position, being combined with Westminster in a single electoral division.

Part V: Special provisions as to local government elections in Scotland
The dates for holding local elections in Scotland was also altered:
Elections for county councillors for landward areas of counties and for district councillors were to be held on the second Tuesday of May in 1949 and every three years thereafter.
Burgh councillors were to be elected on the first Tuesday in May 1949 and annually thereafter.
County councillors representing burghs were to be elected in May 1949 following the council election, and every three years thereafter.

County, district and burgh elections due in 1948 were postponed until 1949, and councillors due to retire were to continue in office. This also applied to county conveners, burgh provosts, honorary treasurers of burghs and chairmen of district councils.

Part VI: General
The final part of the Act listed the duties of the registration officer and established an appeals procedure for persons excluded from the register. It also allowed for funds to be made available for the registration process.

Number of constituencies
Schedule I set out the names, number and constitution of the constituencies, which replaced those created by the Representation of the People Act 1918 and Government of Ireland Act 1920. In a few counties where there had been an exceptional increase in the electorate since 1918, additional constituencies had been created for the 1945 general election by the House of Commons (Redistribution of Seats) Act 1944 as a temporary measure.

Footnotes

References 

Representation of the People Acts
United Kingdom Acts of Parliament 1948
July 1948 events in the United Kingdom